The term overseas territory ( or TOM) is an administrative division of France and is currently only applied to the French Southern and Antarctic Lands.

Unlike the British Overseas Territories, which are not constitutionally part of the United Kingdom or its national territory, they are integral parts of the French Republic.

Former overseas territories 
 New Caledonia, from 1946 to 1999, now a sui generis collectivity
 French Polynesia, from 1946 to 2003, now an overseas collectivity
 Saint Pierre and Miquelon, from 1946 to 1976 and 1985 to 2003, now an overseas collectivity
 Wallis and Futuna, from 1961 to 2003, now an overseas collectivity
 Mayotte, from 1974 to 2003, now an overseas department
 French Territory of the Afars and the Issas, from 1967 to 1977, now the independent state of Djibouti

See also 
 2009 Mahoran status referendum
 Administrative divisions of France
 Overseas collectivity
 Overseas country of France
 Overseas department and region
 Overseas France
 Special member state territories and the European Union

References

External links 
  Official government website
  Past and current developments of France's overseas administrative divisions like DOMs and TOMs

__notoc__